Simitidion simile is a species of comb-footed spider in the family Theridiidae. It is native to Europe, North Africa, Turkey, Israel, Caucasus, Kazakhstan, Iran and Central Asia, and introduced to Canada.

References

Theridiidae
Spiders described in 1832
Palearctic spiders